Longcheng may refer to any of the following locations:

China 

 Longcheng District, a district of Chaoyang, Liaoning
 Longcheng Square station, a station of Line 3 of the Shenzhen Metro
 Longcheng, a former name of Taiyuan, the capital of Shanxi province

Subdistricts

 Longcheng Subdistrict, Shenzhen
 Longcheng Subdistrict, Longmen County, Huizhou, Guangdong
 Longcheng Subdistrict, Xichuan County, Henan
 Longcheng Subdistrict, Taiyuan, Shanxi

Towns

 Longcheng, Tianshui (陇城镇), a town of Qin'an County, Tianshui, Gansu
 Longcheng (龙城镇), a town of Pengze County, Jiujiang, Jiangxi
 Longcheng (龙城镇), a town of Helong City, Jilin
 Longcheng (龙城镇), Yancheng District, Luohe, Henan
 Longcheng (陇城镇), Tongdao Dong Autonomous County, Huaihua, Hunan

Other

 Longcheng community, Shitang Town, Feidong County, Hefei

Laos 

 Long Tieng, a military base, also known as Long Cheng